Saraya Department is one of the 45 departments of Senegal, one of the three making up the Kédougou Region. It was created as part of the new region in 2008.

The chief settlement and only commune is Saraya.

Rural districts (Communautés rurales) comprise:
 Arrondissement of Bembou
 Bembou
 Médina Baffé
 Arrondissement of Sabodala
 Sabodala
 Khossanto
 Missirah Sirimana

Departments of Senegal
Kédougou Region